Joy Uche Angela Ogwu (born August 22, 1946) is a former foreign minister of Nigeria and  a former permanent representative of Nigeria to the United Nations in New York from 2008–2017. She is the first woman to hold the post of Permanent Representative to the United Nations from Nigeria. Prior to her ministerial career, Ogwu, who is from Delta State, served as Director–General of the Nigerian Institute of International Affairs (NIIA).

Ogwu has advised the United Nations Institute for Disarmament Research on disarmament issues and has published books promoting more African ties to Latin America. She is the former chair of the board of trustees of the United Nations Institute for Disarmament Research (UNIDIR).

She was appointed Foreign Minister by Nigerian President Olusegun Obasanjo on August 30, 2006.

In 2008, Ogwu became the Permanent Representative of Nigeria to the UN in New York City. Ogwu was the President of the UN Security Council in July 2010 and in October 2011. She is the former president of the executive board of the UN Women Entity for Gender Equality and the Empowerment of Women.

Ogwu obtained her BA and MA in political science from Rutgers University. She later received her Ph.D. from the University of Lagos in Nigeria.  While obtaining her Ph.D. in 1977, she joined the Institute of International Affairs at the University of Lagos.

Ogwu started her career as an assistant lecturer,  at the Nigerian National War College and the National Institute of Policy and Strategic Studies (NIPSS). She subsequently joined the NIIA as a lecturer, obtaining a research fellowship during which she authored her first book, Nigerian Foreign Policy: Alternative Futures (Macmillan, 1986). She eventually headed the research department in International Politics, leading on to her role as the first female Director General. Professor Ogwu's career has been distinct in its additional focus on the developing countries of Latin America, enabling an investigation into the possibilities of a proficient South-South relationship between Sub-Saharan Africa and Latin America. In this capacity she held a visiting fellowship at the University of London's Institute of Latin American Studies and has been published extensively in Portuguese, Spanish, French and Croatian. As an expert on security issues, she serves on the United Nations Secretary General's Advisory Board on Disarmament Matters.

As a woman in a foremost position in her distinguished career specialization, Ogwu has become a voice for women's development and human rights. In this subject, her perspective spans Asia Pacific, Latin America and Sub-Saharan Africa with prolific publications on regional aspects of the subject. Her participation in the government under the auspices of NIIA and the Presidential Advisory Council on International Relations enabled positive contribution, to practical government policy such as the construct of the Nigeria-South America relationship, on a macro level and the United Nations Educational Social and Cultural Organisation (UNESCO) funded program for teaching human rights in Nigerian Schools on a micro level. Furthermore, her continual role on the Nigerian National Delegation to UN General Assembly exhibits her contribution as an influential figure in the formation of Nigeria's relationship with the rest of the world.

Published books 
Nigerian Foreign Policy: Alternative Futures, published by the Nigerian Institute of International Affairs in co-operation with Macmillan Nigeria Publishers, 1986
Africa and Latin America: Perspectives and Challenges
New Horizons for Nigeria in World Affairs, 2005
 Leadership, Democracy, and the Challenges of Development, 2017

References

External links

 "Nigeria names Rutgers-trained professor as new foreign minister", Newsday'', August 30, 2006 (Accessed August 31, 2006)
 Reference 1
 Reference 2
Nigerian National War College

Foreign ministers of Nigeria
Female foreign ministers
Igbo politicians
Rutgers University alumni
Living people
1946 births
Delta State politicians
Permanent Representatives of Nigeria to the United Nations
Nigerian women diplomats
University of Lagos alumni
Women government ministers of Nigeria
Nigerian women ambassadors